Old Kentucky Turnpike Historic District is a national historic district located at Cedar Bluff, Tazewell County, Virginia. The district encompasses 35 contributing buildings, 3 contributing sites, and 3 contributing structures along Indian Creek Road and Indian Creek. They date from the late-19th to mid-20th centuries.  Notable resources include the concrete bridge, steel railroad trestle, Cecil-Watkins House, Ratliff House, Cedar Bluff Presbyterian Church (c. 1930), the boyhood home of Governor George C. Peery (1873–1952), Thomas Cubine House (c. 1887), Gillespie House (c. 1892), the Old Cedar Bluff High School, Cedar Bluff High School (1906), and the Old Cedar Bluff Town Hall.  Also located in the district is the separately listed Clinch Valley Roller Mills.

It was listed on the National Register of Historic Places in 1995.

References

Historic districts in Tazewell County, Virginia
National Register of Historic Places in Tazewell County, Virginia
Historic districts on the National Register of Historic Places in Virginia